Allkpop (stylized in all lowercase) is an American website which features Korean pop and gossip news. Launched on October 30, 2007, it is based in Edgewater, New Jersey, and is owned and operated by its parent company 6Theory Media. Allkpop is one of the most trafficked K-pop news sites, with over seven and half million readers per month. In its list of useful websites, The Korea Herald called it the "fastest news breaker" for K-pop. 

Despite the praise, some detractors accused the website for inciting racism and xenophobia towards Koreans, and Southeast Asians, by Korean netizens itself, exacerbated by the economic differences between those two regions which is a primary cause of contention.

The website has been revamped since 2013 by blocking the comments section to curb criticism. Prior to the 2013 revamp, the website known for its sensationalist, clickbait headlines which includes, dark humor and insults. International fans accused the website for cherrypicked comments by Korean netizens which pejoratively called by them as K-nets  , referring to Korean users on websites such as Nate Pann and Dcinside, etc. which known for its toxic users with overtly conservative, chauvinistic and nationalistic nature, in contrast to the liberal-dominated Hallyu fandom in the west. In 2013, international fans accused the website for leaking singer Ailee's alleged nude pictures and  called for boycotts by international fans.

References

External links
 

K-pop websites
American music websites
Internet properties established in 2007